The Abbey of Île Barbe was an Abbey built very early in the Christian era, on Île Barbe, outside of Lyon, France.

The abbey was founded on the island in the 5th century and was the first monastic establishment in the Lyon region and one of the oldest in Gaul. Charlemagne endowed it  with a beautiful library.

The abbey adopted the Rule of St. Benedict in the 9th century and gradually gained some wealth. In 816, Louis the Pious granted the monastery the right at any time of three ships on the Saone, the Rhone and the Doubs péages free of taxes;
a decree of immunity and protection to monastère which was confirmed by Charles the Bald in 614.

In the early 16th century, the abbey came under the commendatory of the family of Albon. In 1549, pope Paul III it is secularized and the monks became canons (collegiate). In 1562, she was devastated and burned by the Protestant troops of Baron Adrets.

The chapter of canons was finally removed in 1741, and installs a facility for elderly or infirm priests, which in turn is removed in 1783. During the Revolution, at which point everything was sold and dispersed.

List of Abbots

4??-??? : Saint Dorothée
???-??? : Philetus
???-??? : Julien
???-??? : Christophe
???-??? : Antoine Ier
???-??? : Martin
???-??? : Aigobert
???-??? : Astorg Ier
???-??? : Maxime
???-??? : Ambroise
???-??? : Loup
???-??? : Maximin
???-??? : Bligigaire
???-??? : Vinfrid
???-??? : Rotfred
???-??? : Garland
???-??? : Licinius
???-??? : Saint Benoît Ier
???-??? : Campion
???-??? : Alaric
???-??? : Bartholomée
???-??? : Argeric
???-861 : Herbert
861-8?? : Gundramnus
8??-8?? : Norbert
8??-8?? : Varengard
8??-876 : Garlarin
876-8?? : Léobon
8??-??? : Astorg II
???-??? : Étienne
???-??? : Elgedis
???-??? : Antoine II
???-??? : Halinand
???-??? : Romuald
???-??? : Eudes
???-971 : Cumanus
971-994 : Heldebert
994-1007 : Benoît II
1007-1008 : Bernard
1008-1055 : Garnier
1055-1070 : Humbert
1070-10?? : Ogier
10??-1096 : Clément
1096-1116 :  Guy Ier
1116-1128 : Girin Ier
1128-11?? : Josserand
11??-11?? : Hugues Ier
11??-11?? : Olderic
11??-1150 : Guillaume Ier
1150-1152 : Girin II
1152-11?? : Saturnin
11??-1168 : Vicard
1161 : Hugues de Tournon "Moine"
1168-1183 : Hugues II
1183-1198 : Guichard, abbé
1198-1200 : Gaucerand
1200-1222 : Guy II
1222-1224 : Bermond
1224-1243 : Guillaume II de Jarez
1243-1245 : Foulques
1245-1246 : Omer
1246-1250 : Pierre Ier
1249 : Zacharie de Talaru "Moine"
1250 : Hugues de Varennes "Moine & Cellerier"
1250-1261 : Geoffroy de Vertelay
1256 : Zacharie de Talaru "Moine"
1261 : Humbert de Vassailleu "Moine"
1261-1270 : Pierre II de Vertelay
1270-1296 : Girin III de Sartines
1272 : Aymon de Vaux "Prieur Claustral"
1284-1440 : Hugues, Jean, Pierre & Pierre puis Claude de Roncherol "Moines"
1284 : Robert de Ryon "Religieux"
1296-1322 : André de Marzé
1300 : Estienne de Vego "Moine"
1309 : Guigues de Roussillon "Moine"
1322-1329 : Béraud Ier de Mercœur
1329-1334 : Pons de Guizeu
1334-13?? : Raymond de Beaufort
13??-13?? : Béraud II de La Baume
13??-1345 : Galbald
1345-134? : Simon de Gillans
134?-1350 : Bégon de Brossan
1350-1354 : Jean Ier Pilus-Fortis de Rabastens
1354-1372 : Guillaume III de Landore
1372-1394 : Pierre III de Villette
1383 : Pierre de Verriere "Aumosnier"
1394-1400 : Jean II de Sonhetto
1400-1428 : Pierre IV de Thurey
1401 : Pierre de Verriere "Aumosnier"
1411 : Faucerand du Saix "Religieux"
1419 : Antoine de Salornay "Moine"
1421 : Faucerand du Saix "Religieux"
1421 : Jean Rostain "Moine"
1428-1436 : Aynard de Cordon
1436 : Durand Vert "Moine"
1436 : Berno de Vienne "Moine"
1436 : Durand Vignols "Religieux"
1436-1458 : Claude Ier de Sotizon
1451 : Antoine de Rochefort la Valette "Moine"
1452 : Jean de Vaugrigneuse "Moine"
1453 : Eustache de Vaugrigneuse "Moine"
1453 : Aynard de Villeneufve "Chantre"
1455 : Guillaume de la Sale "Moine"
1458-1485 : Edouard de Messey
1464 : André le Viste "Religieux"
1485-1488 : cardinal Charles de Bourbon
1488-1500 : Henri de Seylac
1500 : Philibert Rosset "Moine"
1507 : Guyllaume de Villeneufve "Moine"
1500-1515 : Antoine III d'Albon de Saint-André
1500 : Jacques de Sassenage "Religieux"
1505 : Guillaume de Semur "Religieux & Chamarier"
1515-1525 : Antoine IV d'Albon de Saint-Forgeul
1525-1562 : Antoine V d'Albon de Saint-Forgeul
1550 : Claude Sautreau "Moine & Chantre"
1551 : Fleury de Salemard "Religieux Cloistrier"
1551 : Louis Vallier "Moine"
1551 : Antoine de Vauselles "Moine"
1562-1599 : Pierre V d'Espignac
1599-1609 : Jean III de Châtillon
1606-1613 : Claude II de Nérestang
1616-1620 : Antoine VI de Nérestang
1620-1693 : Camille de Neufville de Villeroy
1630-1660 : Claude Le Laboureur, prévôt du chapitre
1693-1741 : Antoine VII de Thélis de Saint-Cyr de Valorges

References

Benedictine monasteries in France
Abbey of Ile Barbe}
Christian monasteries established in the 5th century